William Edward Nordeen (October 9, 1936 – June 28, 1988) was a US Navy captain and diplomat. Born in Amery, Wisconsin and raised in nearby Centuria, he was the United States defense and naval attaché to the U.S. Embassy in Athens, Greece. Nordeen was killed in Greece by a bomb set off by far-left anti-imperialist terrorist group 17 November due to his involvement in the US Navy and the US embassy in Greece.

The 51-year-old US Navy captain was driving in an armor-plated sedan near Athens when a car bomb was detonated next to him via remote control. He was thrown from the car and killed by the blast. He was buried at Arlington National Cemetery, in Arlington, Virginia.

The Greek urban guerrilla Marxist organization 17 November claimed the blast, making Nordeen one of five American embassy employees killed by the organization.

Notes

External links

 

1936 births
1988 deaths
1988 murders in Greece
United States Navy officers
American diplomats
Assassinated American diplomats
Assassinated military personnel
Burials at Arlington National Cemetery
Deaths by car bomb
Victims of the Revolutionary Organization 17 November
American terrorism victims
Terrorism deaths in Greece
American people murdered abroad
Male murder victims
People murdered in Greece
People from Amery, Wisconsin
Military personnel from Wisconsin
American military personnel killed in action
United States naval attachés